Seeley International is Australia's largest air conditioning manufacturer in South Australia.

See also

List of South Australian manufacturing businesses

References

External links

1972 establishments in Australia
Australian companies established in 1972
Companies based in South Australia
Manufacturing companies based in Adelaide
Family-owned companies of Australia
Heating, ventilation, and air conditioning companies
Home appliance manufacturers of Australia